Spruce Hill may refer to:

 Spruce Hill Township, Minnesota
 Spruce Hill Township, Juniata County, Pennsylvania
 Spruce Hill, Philadelphia, Pennsylvania, a neighborhood in Philadelphia